Top of the Line is the debut solo album by Tito "El Bambino". It was released on March 21, 2006 by EMI Televisa Music.
Top of The Line featured 20 songs, with collaboration from artists such as Daddy Yankee, Don Omar and Beenie Man. It featured quite a number of hits, such as "Caile", "Mia" (with Daddy Yankee), "Tu Cintura" (with Don Omar), "Flow Natural" (with Beenie Man and Deevani) "Secreto", "Máximo", "Tuve Que Morir" and "Me Da Miedo" among others. Caile was the first single and it peaked at #1 in the Billboard Hot Latin charts. Top of the Line: El Internacional edition includes a bonus DVD featuring live concert footage and music videos. It was released February 6, 2007 and was nominated for a Lo Nuestro Award for Urban Album of the Year.

Track listing

Galería De Fotos is Spanish for photo gallery. This is not a video and that's why there is not time limit on it.

An EP version of El Internacional (The International) is available on all digital streaming platforms. It contains tracks 2-5.  For some reason the full edition isn't avaialbe. It could probably be because tracks 7-19 are from the standard edition. Also some of the standard edition tracks are not in the international version.

Reception

Top of the Line was a hit, reaching #1 in Puerto Rico and knocking R.K.M & Ken-Y's album, "Masterpiece", to #2 (which was a huge achievement, as R.K.M & Ken-Y were being called "The New Héctor & Tito" and their CD, Masterpiece, was also an incredible hit). However, even though Top of The Line sold incredibly well, it fell short of beating Masterpiece's record of most CDs sold in the first week of release in Puerto Rico.  The album would eventually reach Latin platinum status selling over 200,000 copies.

Chart performance

Sales and certifications

References

2006 debut albums
Tito El Bambino albums
Albums produced by Luny Tunes
Albums produced by Noriega
Albums produced by Nely